Aamer Wasim (28 October 1960 – 26 September 2018) was a Pakistani cricketer. He played 67 first-class and 46 List A matches for several domestic sides in Pakistan between 1983 and 2003.

References

External links
 

1960 births
2018 deaths
Pakistani cricketers
Gujranwala cricketers
Pakistan Railways cricketers
Rawalpindi cricketers
Pakistan Customs cricketers
Biman Bangladesh Airlines cricketers
Sialkot cricketers
Pakistan Automobiles Corporation cricketers
Cricketers from Sialkot